In soil, macropores are defined as cavities that are larger than 75 μm. Functionally, pores of this size host preferential soil solution flow and rapid transport of solutes and colloids. Macropores increase the hydraulic conductivity of soil, allowing water to infiltrate and drain quickly, and shallow groundwater to move relatively rapidly via lateral flow. In soil, macropores are created by plant roots, soil cracks, soil fauna, and by aggregation of soil particles into peds.

Macropores may be defined differently in other contexts. Within the context of porous solids (i.e., not porous aggregations such as soil), colloid and surface chemists define macropores as cavities that are larger than 50 nm.

See also
 Characterisation of pore space in soil
 Nanoporous materials

References

Hydrology
Soil physics
Porous media